Coleonyx nemoralis is a gecko endemic to  Mexico.

References

Coleonyx
Reptiles of Mexico
Reptiles described in 1945